Chilia may refer to:

Places:
 Kiliia (spelled Chilia Nouă, "New Chilia", in Romanian), a town in Ukraine
 Chilia Veche ("Old Chilia"), a commune in Tulcea County, Romania
 Chilia, a village in Bârgăuani Commune, Neamț County, Romania
 Chilia, a village in Făgețelu Commune, Olt County, Romania
 Chilia, a village in Homoroade Commune, Satu Mare County, Romania
 Chilia River (disambiguation), two Romanian rivers
 Chilia branch, a distributary of the Danube

Other uses:
 David Chilia (born 1978), Vanuatuan international football goalkeeper
 Seimata Chilia (born 1978), Vanuatuan international football midfielder
 Chilia, the genus of the crag chilia, a South American bird

See also
 Chillia District, Peru
 Kilia (disambiguation)